Trust Merchant Bank or TMB, is a commercial bank based in the Democratic Republic of Congo (DRC), with its headquarters located in Lubumbashi. The bank began operations in 2004. TMB operates in all sectors of the local banking market, including in retail banking, SME banking, corporate banking, and mobile banking.

The bank is regulated by the Central Bank of Congo and is a member of the Association Congolaise des Banques.

Overview
Trust Merchant Bank is one of the DRC's largest banks as measured by regulatory equity, total assets and turnover. As of 31 December 2019, total assets were in excess of US$1bn, equivalent to approximately 12% of total bank assets in the DRC, with shareholders' equity of US$96mn. TMB is a member of the SWIFT interbank network (TRMSCD3L) and is also a principal member of MasterCard, and Visa.

Bank Characteristics

Trust Merchant Bank has several unique characteristics:
 TMB was the first Congolese financial institution to launch a proprietary mobile banking service.
 TMB is the only bank to offer a nationwide branch network.
 It is the only bank headquartered in a city other than the national capital, Kinshasa.
 The Bank was the first Congolese bank to secure a licence to open a Representative Office in Brussels.

Branch Network
Trust Merchant Bank operates over one hundred and five branches across twenty one provinces of the Democratic Republic of Congo:

 Bandundu-Ville
 Beni
 Boma
 Bukavu (multiple branches)
 Bunia
 Butembo
 Fungurume
 Gbadolite
 Gemena
 Goma (multiple branches)
 Kabinda
 Kalemie
 Kamina
 Kamoa
 Kananga
 Kasumbalesa (multiple branches)
 Kenge
 Kikwit
 Kilwa
 Kindu
 Kinshasa (multiple branches)
 Kitona
 Kisangani
 Kolwezi (multiple branches)
 Likasi
 Lodja
 Logu
 Lubumbashi (multiple branches)
 Manono
 Matadi (multiple branches)
 Mbandaka
 Mbanza Ngundu
 Mbuji-Mayi
 Mwene-Ditu
 Muanda
 Uvira
The Bank maintains a representative office in Brussels.

TMB is the only bank in the DRC to operate bank branches onsite at a number of MONUSCO sites across the country, including in Kisangani and Bunia.

Awards
The African Banker named TMB as the Best Bank in Central Africa in 2014 and again in 2017. TMB was named as Bank of the Year Democratic Republic of Congo in 2012, 2013, 2014, 2015, 2017, 2018 and 2019 by The Banker. EMEA Finance awarded TMB the title Best Bank in the Democratic Republic of Congo for the ninth consecutive year in 2019.

In 2014, 2015, 2016 and 2020 Global Finance Magazine recognised TMB as the Best Bank in the Democratic Republic of Congo.

Le Monde des Flamboyants
TMB's regional headquarters in Kinshasa plays host to Le Monde des Flamboyants, a multi-purpose exhibition gallery.

Acquisition by KCB Group
In August 2022, KCB Group, based in Nairobi, Kenya agreed to acquire 85 percent shareholding in Trust Merchant Bank at "1.49 times the book value".. It is estimated that that would cost approximately KSh15 billion/= (US$127 million then). KCB also agreed to acquire the remaining 15 percent ownership in the bank, not later than 2024. The deal requires shareholder and regulatory approvals in DRCongo and Kenya.

References

External links
 Trust Merchant Bank Official Website 
 Trust Merchant Bank Twitter

Banks of the Democratic Republic of the Congo
Lubumbashi